Carbon Copy is a 1981 comedy-drama film directed by Michael Schultz, produced by RKO Pictures and Hemdale Film Corporation, and released by Avco Embassy Pictures. The film stars George Segal, Susan Saint James, Jack Warden and Denzel Washington in his film acting debut. It was the first feature film produced by RKO after a break of many years.

Plot
Roger Porter (Washington), a young and somewhat naive black man, is the long-lost son of Walter Whitney (Segal), a successful businessman living in the exclusive, predominantly white community of San Marino, California. Walter, who is secretly Jewish, lives a frustrating life in his gated community as he constantly has to beg his shrewish wife for sex, plus he has to put up with his obnoxious step-daughter's antics. Roger turns up at Walter's office, revealing that he is the result of Walter's long-ago relationship with a black woman, who is now dead. For purposes of professional advancement in the business, Walter had left Roger's mother. The only person who knew about Roger's mother was his anti-Semitic and racist father-in-law Nelson Longhurst (Warden), who is also his boss. Nelson had warned him that if he continued his relationship with Roger's mother he would see to it that Walter would never prosper in his career, so Walter forcefully broke it off.

Attempting to make it up to Roger, Walter tells his wife Vivian (Saint James) that he wants to have Roger live with them for the summer as a foster son. She accepts, but soon regrets the decision after she finds out about Roger's real relationship with Walter. She kicks Walter out. Nelson fires him, taking his car and credit cards. His lawyer and erstwhile best friend says that he will be representing Vivian in the divorce, but gives him a referral to another lawyer Bob Garvey, who is African-American. Garvey tells him that all his money is in accounts in only Vivian's name, so all he has left is the money in his wallet, $68. Walter checks into a sleazy motel with Roger and tries to make ends meet by shoveling manure in a stable. Roger hocks Walter's golf clubs to finance them to move into a rundown apartment in Watts. Meanwhile, Nelson watches Walter's every move to make sure Walter receives no help from the world he knew, so that Walter will return to his old world without Roger.

Walter's wife Vivian and Nelson visit him in the apartment, telling Walter they miss him. He then has to choose between either acceptance that Roger is his son, or alienation of Roger to salvage his own position in society. He chooses the latter, but his conscience bothers him to the extreme where he then decides to sacrifice everything again to return to Roger, dismissing Nelson's threats that this time he will make Walter really suffer.

After meeting Roger again, Walter's new lawyer reveals that Roger isn't a high school dropout, but is actually a pre-med college student at Walter's old alma mater Northwestern University. He takes Walter to where Roger is at the side of the road working on his car, and first Walter tells him that he wants to go and work for an old acquaintance to live nearby him, but eventually decides to go and stay with Roger's aunt Clara and be a full part of his life. As the movie ends, Walter, proud of his son, rides along in Roger's jalopy, deciding to finally give him the time they never had before.

Cast
 George Segal as Walter Whitney
 Susan Saint James as Vivian Whitney
 Jack Warden as Nelson Longhurst
 Dick Martin as Victor Bard
 Denzel Washington as Roger Porter
 Paul Winfield as Bob Garvey
 Macon McCalman as Tubby Wederholt
 Vicky Dawson as Mary Ann, Vivian's daughter
 Doug Laird as Motorcycle Police Officer

Production 
The film was the first to be produced by RKO Pictures in 23 years, after it had declined in the 1950s and stopped making new films. The Hemdale Film Corporation and RKO co-financed the film, and CBS paid $3 million to fund post-production in exchange for allowing television screenings of the film on its network. Avco Embassy Pictures later received the rights to distribute the film in the United States, while Carolco Pictures received international distribution rights.

Principal photography began on May 19, 1980, at the Samuel Goldwyn Studio in Hollywood, California, and concluded in July 1980. The production used 25 locations in Southern California, including Malibu and Lancaster.

Carbon Copy initially received an R rating from the MPAA, but it was reduced to a PG rating on appeal.

Home media
The film premiered with a benefit screening at the Directors Guild Theater in Los Angeles attended by former Vice President Walter Mondale, with proceeds going to the Hamburger Home.

The film is considered a box-office bomb.

The film was released on VHS, Betamax, and LaserDisc in 1983 by Embassy Home Entertainment.

The film was released on DVD in 2004 by MGM Home Entertainment in a pan and scan format.

Shout! Factory (under license from MGM) released the film in its original widescreen format on Blu-ray in 2018.

References

External links
 
 
 

1981 films
Films directed by Michael Schultz
Films about race and ethnicity
1980s English-language films
1981 comedy-drama films
RKO Pictures films
Embassy Pictures films
Films set in Los Angeles County, California
British comedy-drama films
American comedy-drama films
Films scored by Bill Conti
1981 comedy films
1981 drama films
Films shot in Los Angeles County, California
1980s American films
1980s British films